John Bailey Peddle (Terre Haute, Indiana, February 27, 1868 – idem, April 6, 1933) was an American mechanical engineer, Professor of Machine Design at the Rose Polytechnic Institute and author, known for his seminal work Construction of Graphical Charts, 1910.

Life and work 
Peddle was the son of Charles R. and Mary Elizabeth Ball Peddle. He graduated at the Rose Rose Polytechnic Institute in 1888, and after six years in business joint the faculty in 1894‎ as instructor in machine design. From 1897 until 1933 he was Professor of Machine Design back at the Rose Polytechnic Institute. 

In 1910 Peddle published the Construction of Graphical Charts, which was the first book in the English language treating of the art of graphical representation. The work was written from an mathematical point of view, and required some engineering training. In 1914 Willard C. Brinton published a similar work for the general audience with no mathematics, called Graphic Methods for Presenting Facts.

Peddle has been member of the American Society of Mechanical Engineers, and the Indiana Academy of Science. 

Peddle was also an amateur photographer, who published some of his work and articles in The Photographic times magazine including a self-portrait.

Family 
Peddle's younger sister was the sculptor Caroline Peddle Ball (1869–1938). Peddle married Alice O Peddle, and they had 2 children: Juliet Peddle (1899–1979), an modernist architect, and one other child.

Publications 
 The construction of graphical charts, New York, McGraw-Hill, 1910.

Article's, a selection
 "Alinement Diagram in the Graphical Solution of Equations," By John B Peddle, 1905.
 "The construction of graphical charts," in: American Machinist, May 30, 1908.
 "Color Photography," in: Proceedings of the American Institute of Electrical Engineers. 1915.
 "Carl Leo Mees," in: Science. September 2, 1932. Vol 76, Issue 1966. pp. 206–207

References 

American mechanical engineers
Rose–Hulman Institute of Technology alumni
Rose–Hulman Institute of Technology